HMS Teredo was a British submarine of the third group of the T class. She was built as P338 at Vickers Armstrong, Barrow and launched on 27 April 1945.  So far she has been the only ship of the Royal Navy to bear the name Teredo, possibly after a mollusc, the shipworm, of that name.

Commissioned after the end of the Second World War, Teredo had a relatively peaceful career.  Gordon Tait commanded her in 1947 to 1948. In 1953 she took part in the Fleet Review to celebrate the Coronation of Queen Elizabeth II. She was finally scrapped at Briton Ferry, Wales on 5 June 1965.

References

Publications
 
 

 

British T-class submarines of the Royal Navy
Ships built in Barrow-in-Furness
1945 ships
World War II submarines of the United Kingdom
Cold War submarines of the United Kingdom